The Dar Al Awadi Tower is the ninth  tallest building in Kuwait. It has 35 floors and it is 171 metres high. Its construction was completed in 2005.

Dar Abdullah Al Awadi Complex Shopping Center and Offices Tower is one of the Real Estate Investment Company projects.

The tower is located in the center of the capital with high panoramic view of the Persian Gulf. Its external finishing is a combination of glazier, granite, marble and stainless steel ribs.

From a distance, the first part of the building that can be seen is the high rising tower with its stainless steel dome nested by a wide stainless steel circular saucer-shape roof canopy carried by a 34 story of Quintuple shape building. This is the share of commercial offices.

The center has four floors above ground level and one basement. A broad atrium stands in the center of the mall, covered by huge skylight dome. A fountain embraces the two panoramic elevators.

There is an adjacent car park with a capacity of more than 650 cars.

See also

 List of tallest buildings in Kuwait

References

2005 establishments in Kuwait
Skyscrapers in Kuwait

Buildings and structures completed in 2005